Lotha may refer to:
Lotha Naga, a Naga tribe in Wokha district, Nagaland, India
Lotha language, spoken in Wokha, Nagaland, India

See also

Lotta (disambiguation)

Language and nationality disambiguation pages